Amelia is an unincorporated community and former village in Pierce and Batavia townships in Clermont County, Ohio, United States. The population was 4,801 at the 2010 census. Amelia incorporated in 1900. In November 2019, residents voted to dissolve the village over the imposition of a local income tax. Amelia was by far the most populous village in state history to be dissolved and the first to be partitioned between two townships.

History

Amelia was not officially platted. The area was originally called Milltown, later shortened to Milton. However, when a post office was established in 1836, there was already a Milton Post Office in the state. Various accounts state that the post office was named Amelia after Amelia Bowdoin, a well known and popular tollkeeper on the Ohio Turnpike (present-day State Route 125). Her home is now known as the Amelia Bowdoin House and stands at 94 West Main Street, across the street from its original location. However, there is no census record of an Amelia Bowdoin; Amelia may have been a corruption of the name of Armilla Bodin, the wife of a tollkeeper. Amelia was incorporated as a village on December 20, 1900.

Amelia's population rose from 4,801 in the 2010 census to an estimated 5,009 in 2018. Under state law, the village would have been required to become a city after it posted a population over 5,000 in the 2020 census. In preparation for becoming a city, it adopted a charter in November 2017, though the change in status was not reflected in the Ohio Secretary of State's roster of municipalities. Among other changes, becoming a city would have protected Amelia from dissolution.

Dissolution

In 2008, Amelia Village Council proposed a one-percent income tax to cover maintenance of Ohio State Route 125 within the village. In response to the proposal, Amelia Residents for Fiscal Responsibility gathered a petition to dissolve the village into Pierce and Batavia townships. The Clermont County Board of Elections initially rejected the petition after invalidating many of the signatures, but the group succeeded in adding the initiative to a May 5, 2009, special election. Amelia survived the election by a margin of 865 to 401.

On February 5, 2018, the council unanimously adopted the proposed one-percent income tax in an emergency ordinance, without the usual three readings, to meet a deadline imposed by the Regional Income Tax Authority. The tax went into effect on July 1, 2018, making Amelia the last village in Clermont County to impose an income tax after cuts to the state's local government fund and one of more than 600 cities and villages in Ohio that tax income. Former councilmember Renee Gerber subsequently led a petition drive for dissolution. A June 29 council meeting became heated over the tax and dissolution campaign.

On November 5, 2019, residents voted to dissolve the village by a margin of 843 to 479. Amelia was split between Pierce and Batavia townships along State Route 125. Newtonsville residents voted for dissolution the same day. Dissolution took effect at 10:00 AM on November 25, 2019, when the election results were certified. Gerber was elected to serve as the village's final mayor during a yearlong transition period under the oversight of the Ohio State Auditor, but upon the auditor's advice, Hart was retained to carry out the village's remaining administrative responsibilities. Amelia residents will continue to pay the one-percent income tax until at least $ in debt is paid off. Amelia was by far the most populous village in state history to be dissolved and the first to be partitioned between two townships.

Geography
Amelia is located at  (39.029123, -84.221111).

Demographics

2010 census
As of the census of 2010, there were 4,801 people, 1,830 households, and 1,238 families living in the village. The racial makeup of the village was 95.1% White, 1.6% African American, 0.3% Native American, 0.7% Asian, 0.6% from other races, and 1.6% from two or more races. Hispanic or Latino of any race were 1.9% of the population.

There were 1,830 households, of which 41.5% had children under the age of 18 living with them, 49.2% were married couples living together, 13.3% had a female householder with no husband present, 5.1% had a male householder with no wife present, and 32.3% were non-families. 26.0% of all households were made up of individuals, and 7.2% had someone living alone who was 65 years of age or older. The average household size was 2.62 and the average family size was 3.15.

The median age in the village was 30.5 years. 29.7% of residents were under the age of 18; 8.3% were between the ages of 18 and 24; 36.6% were from 25 to 44; 19.7% were from 45 to 64; and 5.9% were 65 years of age or older. The gender makeup of the village was 48.5% male and 51.5% female.

2000 census
As of the census of 2000, there were 2,752 people, 1,063 households, and 738 families living in the village. The population density was 2,007.2 people per square mile (775.6/km2). There were 1,112 housing units at an average density of 811.1 per square mile (313.4/km2). The racial makeup of the village was 96.77% White, 0.58% African American, 0.07% Native American, 0.29% Asian, 0.73% from other races, and 1.56% from two or more races. Hispanic or Latino of any race were 1.27% of the population.

There were 1,063 households, out of which 41.1% had children under the age of 18 living with them, 53.0% were married couples living together, 12.0% had a female householder with no husband present, and 30.5% were non-families. 24.8% of all households were made up of individuals, and 10.3% had someone living alone who was 65 years of age or older. The average household size was 2.59 and the average family size was 3.10.

In the village, the population was spread out, with 28.5% under the age of 18, 10.6% from 18 to 24, 39.3% from 25 to 44, 13.9% from 45 to 64, and 7.6% who were 65 years of age or older. The median age was 29 years. For every 100 females there were 89.0 males. For every 100 females age 18 and over, there were 86.9 males.

The median income for a household in the village was $44,900, and the median income for a family was $51,699. Males had a median income of $37,500 versus $26,295 for females. The per capita income for the village was $17,772. About 5.0% of families and 7.6% of the population were below the poverty line, including 5.7% of those under age 18 and 14.1% of those age 65 or over.

Education
Amelia has a public library, a branch of the Clermont County Public Library.

References

External links

 

Former villages in Clermont County, Ohio
Former municipalities in Ohio
1900 establishments in Ohio
Populated places established in 1900
2019 disestablishments in Ohio
Populated places disestablished in 2019
Unincorporated communities in Clermont County, Ohio